The Fury is a 2016 Dutch drama film directed by André van Duren. It was based on the novel De Helleveeg by A.F. Th. van der Heijden.

Plot
Tiny lives with her domineering parents as a housekeeper of sorts. She is visited and rejected by several suitors, eventually marrying Koos. Over the years she shares many private moments with her nephew Albert, with whom she is close. It is through these moments, and through arguments with her parents and sister, that we learn about Tiny's character and get a glimpse of the secret at the heart of her personality.

Cast
 Hadewych Minis as Hanny
 Hannah Hoekstra as Tiny
 Frank Lammers as Nico van Dartel
 Benja Bruijning as Albert
 Robert de Hoog as Koos
 Anneke Blok as Grandmother
 Gijs Scholten van Aschat as Grandfather

Accolades
At the Golden Calf awards, The Fury won in the categories of Best Actress (Hoekstra) and Best Supporting Actress (Anneke Blok). At the 2016 Montreal World Film Festival, the award for Best Actress went to Hoekstra for The Fury.

References

External links
 

2016 films
2016 drama films
Dutch drama films
2010s Dutch-language films
Films directed by André van Duren